The Zipser Berg is a hill in the Franconian Jura in the German state of Bavaria.

Hills of Bavaria
Mountains and hills of the Franconian Jura